Alexander Kedoh Hill (born September 8, 1990) is a  professional lacrosse player for the Buffalo Bandits of the National Lacrosse League and the Six Nations Chiefs of Major Series Lacrosse. Hailing from Six Nations of the Grand River, Hill began his career with the hometown Six Nations Arrows of the Ontario Junior A Lacrosse League, with whom he played from 2009 to 2011. Hill was eventually called up to the Six Nations Chiefs, and was a member of the 2013 and 2014 Mann Cup winning Chiefs club.

Initially drafted by Edmonton Rush in the 2010 NLL Entry Draft, Hill saw success in his first game, as he recorded two goals and two assists in a 10-7 loss to the Boston Blazers. He, along with Andy Secore and Ryan Cousins, was traded to the Rochester Knighthawks prior to the 2012 season, and spent time in and out of the lineup. At the 2013 trade deadline, Hill was traded to the Bandits for defenseman Scott Self. Currently, Hill is still playing for the Buffalo Bandits. In 2017, he finished with a career high 31 points in 20 games.

References

External links
NLL stats at pointstreak.com
MSL stats at pointstreak.com
OLA stats at pointstreak.com

1990 births
Living people
First Nations sportspeople
Iroquois nations lacrosse players
Buffalo Bandits players
Edmonton Rush players
Rochester Knighthawks players